Brushy Run is an unincorporated community located on U.S. Highway 220 in Pendleton County, West Virginia, United States. Brushy Run lies where North Mill Creek is formed at the confluence of Stony Creek and Brushy Run, from which the community takes its name.

Climate
The climate in this area has mild differences between highs and lows, and there is adequate rainfall year-round.  According to the Köppen Climate Classification system, Brushy Run has a marine west coast climate, abbreviated "Cfb" on climate maps.

References

Unincorporated communities in Pendleton County, West Virginia
Unincorporated communities in West Virginia